The 2011–12 Illinois Fighting Illini men's basketball team represented the University of Illinois at Urbana–Champaign in the 2011–12 NCAA Division I men's basketball season. This was head coach Bruce Weber's ninth and final season at Illinois. The Illini played their home games at Assembly Hall and were members of the Big Ten Conference.

Pre-season

Departures

2011–12 incoming team members
Prior to the 2011–12 season, Illinois welcomed seven new players into the program.  The 2011 recruiting class was ranked No. 13 by Scout.com and No. 11 by both Rivals.com and ESPNU.  The class was celebrated for its talent and depth, and is the second class in a row that has revived top-15 national rankings.  Six true freshman; Tracy Abrams, Myke Henry, Devin Langford, Nnanna Egwu, Mike Shaw, and Ibby Djimde as well as one transfer senior, Sam Maniscalco joined the 2011–12 team. Maniscalso transferred from Bradley University after graduating in May 2011.  Because Bradley did not offer the graduate program he enrolled in at Illinois, Maniscalco was eligible to play immediately.

2011 Recruiting Class

Italy Trip
Prior to the start of fall semester classes, the team embarked on a 10-day international tour of Italy in August, 2011.  With stops in Rome, Florence, Venice, and Como the trip was a combination of basketball, sightseeing, and team-building.  The team played four full games, which included wins over Roma Select, Castellanza Select, and Fulgor Omegna as well as an overtime loss to the New Zealand National team  Also, the Illini traveled to Aviano Air Base, where Illinois played West Virginia in a 20-minute scrimmage and the Aviano varsity team in a 10-minute scrimmage.

Roster

Schedule

|-
!colspan=12 style="background:#DF4E38; color:white;"| Exhibition

|-
!colspan=12 style="background:#DF4E38; color:white;"| Non-Conference regular season

|-
!colspan=9 style="background:#DF4E38; color:#FFFFFF;"|Big Ten regular season

|-
!colspan=9 style="text-align: center; background:#DF4E38"|Big Ten tournament

National rankings

Season Statistics

Regular season

Post-season

Did not qualify

Notes

References

Illinois
Illinois Fighting Illini men's basketball seasons
Illinois
Illinois